Colfax County is a county in the U.S. state of New Mexico. As of the 2010 census, the population was 13,750. Its county seat is Raton. It is south from the Colorado state line. This county was named for Schuyler Colfax (18231885), seventeenth Vice President of the United States under U.S. President Ulysses S. Grant.

Colfax County is the home of Philmont Scout Ranch and the NRA Whittington Center.

History
Colfax County was originally part of Taos County, one of the original nine counties created by the New Mexico Territory in 1852. In 1859, the eastern part of Taos County, including all of the territory of Colfax County, was split off to form Mora County. Colfax County was established on January 25, 1869, from the northern part of Mora County. The original county seat was the gold mining town of Elizabethtown.

By 1872, when the gold rush in Elizabethtown had died down, the county seat was moved to Cimarron. Cimarron was on the stage coach route along the Mountain Branch of the Santa Fe Trail, and was the headquarters of the Maxwell Land Grant. The Colfax County Courthouse in Cimarron is a contributing structure in the Cimarron Historic District, and is still in use as a Masonic lodge.

In 1881, the county seat moved from Cimarron to Springer, on the former Atchison, Topeka, and Santa Fe Railroad, since 1996 part of the Burlington Northern Railroad. The Colfax County Courthouse in Springer was the site of one of the last important shoot-outs in the Colfax County War. This former courthouse, which is on the National Register of Historic Places is now a museum devoted to the Santa Fe Trail.

The eastern portions of Colfax, Mora, and San Miguel counties were severed to form Union County in 1893.

After a referendum and a bitter legislative fight, the county seat moved from Springer to Raton in 1897. Raton was an important coal-mining town, and was also a railroad center. The citizens of Raton raised $8000 to pay one third of the costs of a new courthouse. That courthouse was replaced in 1932 by the current Colfax County Courthouse (Raton, New Mexico), an art-deco WPA structure that also is on the National Register of Historic Places.

Geography

A large portion of the County lies in the Sangre de Cristo Mountains. Geography ranges from prairies, to pinon forests, to alpine meadows.

The County contains numerous state parks, ski resorts, national forests, scenic vistas, and outdoor recreational activities.

Adjacent counties
 Taos County - west
 Mora County - south
 Harding County - south
 Union County - east
 Las Animas County, Colorado - north
 Costilla County, Colorado - northwest

National protected areas
 Carson National Forest (part)
 Kiowa National Grassland (part)
 Maxwell National Wildlife Refuge

Demographics

2000 census
As of the 2000 census, there were 14,189 people, 5,821 households, and 3,975 families living in the county. The population density was 4 people per square mile (1/km2). There were 8,959 housing units at an average density of 2 per square mile (1/km2). The racial makeup of the county was 81.50% White, 0.32% Black or African American, 1.47% Native American, 0.32% Asian, 0.01% Pacific Islander, 12.80% from other races, and 3.59% from two or more races. 47.49% of the population were Hispanic or Latino of any race.

There were 5,821 households, out of which 30.30% had children under the age of 18 living with them, 52.80% were married couples living together, 10.30% had a female householder with no husband present, and 31.70% were non-families. 27.70% of all households were made up of individuals, and 11.90% had someone living alone who was 65 years of age or older. The average household size was 2.37 and the average family size was 2.86.

In the county, the population was spread out, with 25.10% under the age of 18, 6.90% from 18 to 24, 24.50% from 25 to 44, 26.50% from 45 to 64, and 16.90% who were 65 years of age or older. The median age was 41 years. For every 100 females there were 102.70 males. For every 100 females age 18 and over, there were 98.30 males.

The median income for a household in the county was $30,744, and the median income for a family was $36,827. Males had a median income of $26,736 versus $19,644 for females. The per capita income for the county was $16,418. About 12.00% of families and 14.80% of the population were below the poverty line, including 21.20% of those under age 18 and 9.00% of those age 65 or over.

2010 census
As of the 2010 census, there were 13,750 people, 6,011 households, and 3,749 families living in the county. The racial makeup of the county was 83.8% white, 1.5% American Indian, 0.5% black or African American, 0.4% Asian, 0.1% Pacific islander, 10.3% from other races, and 3.6% from two or more races. Those of Hispanic or Latino origin made up 47.2% of the population. In terms of ancestry, 14.1% were German, 9.7% were Irish, 9.3% were English, 6.1% were Italian, and 3.7% were American.

Of the 6,011 households, 25.8% had children under the age of 18 living with them, 45.9% were married couples living together, 10.9% had a female householder with no husband present, 37.6% were non-families, and 32.9% of all households were made up of individuals. The average household size was 2.22 and the average family size was 2.78. The median age was 46.7 years.

The median income for a household in the county was $39,216 and the median income for a family was $48,450. Males had a median income of $35,849 versus $23,977 for females. The per capita income for the county was $21,047. About 11.8% of families and 17.2% of the population were below the poverty line, including 23.8% of those under age 18 and 16.4% of those age 65 or over.

Communities

City
 Raton (county seat)

Town
 Springer

Villages
 Angel Fire
 Cimarron
 Eagle Nest
 Maxwell

Census-designated place
 Ute Park

Unincorporated communities

 Black Lake
 Carisbrook
 Colmar
 Dawson
 Dillon
 Elizabethtown
 Farley
 Miami
 Philmont Scout Ranch
 Pittsburg
 Rayado
 Sunny Side
 Sweetwater
 Van Houten

Former communities
 Abbott

Politics
Colfax County is a bellwether county in presidential elections; since 1912, the county has voted for the winner of the presidential election in most elections, with the only exceptions being in 1968, 1988, 2000 and 2020, when the county voted for Hubert Humphrey, Michael Dukakis, Al Gore and Donald Trump, respectively.

Education
School districts include:
 Cimarron Public Schools
 Des Moines Municipal Schools
 Maxwell Municipal Schools
 Raton Public Schools
 Springer Municipal Schools

See also
 National Register of Historic Places listings in Colfax County, New Mexico
 Vermejo Park Ranch

References

External links

 Official Colfax County Website
 Colfax County information

 
1869 establishments in New Mexico Territory
Populated places established in 1869